The John Dixon House is a historic house located in Payson, Utah, United States. It was listed on the National Register of Historic Places on February 17, 1978.

Description and history 
The house was built in 1893. According to its 1977 NRHP nomination, the house "is architecturally significant as a rare example of the influence of the Richardsonian Romanesque mode of design on residential architecture of the state. The high quality of craftsmanship represented in the building is also significant."

It is also a contributing building in the Payson Historic District, which was listed on the National Register in 2007.

See also

 National Register of Historic Places listings in Utah County, Utah
 Christopher F. Dixon, Jr., House, also NRHP-listed in Payson

References

External links

Houses completed in 1893
Houses on the National Register of Historic Places in Utah
Romanesque Revival architecture in Utah
Houses in Utah County, Utah
National Register of Historic Places in Utah County, Utah
Buildings and structures in Payson, Utah
Individually listed contributing properties to historic districts on the National Register in Utah